Angela Bacelar Mariotto is a statistician who researches the development and improvement of cancer progress measures. She is chief of the data analytics branch at the National Cancer Institute. Mariotto was a researcher at the Istituto Superiore di Sanità.

Education 
Mariotto received her Doctor of Philosophy in Statistics from the Imperial College London. Her 1988 thesis was titled Empirical Bayes inference and the linear model. Mariotto's doctoral advisor was David Cox.

Career 
Mariotto worked at the Istituto Superiore di Sanità for a decade. She joined the National Cancer Institute (NCI) in November 1999. Mariotto is the chief of the data analytics branch (DAB) of the surveillance research program (SRP) within the division of cancer control and population sciences (DCCPS) at NCI.

Works 
Mariotto's research interests include development and improvement of cancer progress measures, in particular survival, prevalence, quality of life, utilization, and cost measures. Her other areas of expertise include the development and application of models to predict incidence and prevalence from cancer survival and mortality data, and models for survival projections. 

She is the NCI scientific coordinator of the prostate cancer working groups in the Cancer Intervention and Surveillance Network (CISNET) cooperative agreement, for which she coordinates research activities of three grantees who are investigating questions related to the impact of screening and treatment interventions on prostate cancer mortality trends. 

Mariotto is also responsible for developing new prevalence measures and for reporting the new cancer prevalence statistics to the nation each year. At NCI, Mariotto's duties include management of grants, independent research, and service duties, including helping to disseminate cancer statistics to the general public.

References

External links 

 
 

Living people
Place of birth missing (living people)
Year of birth missing (living people)
Alumni of Imperial College London
National Institutes of Health people
Women statisticians
21st-century women mathematicians